Lieutenant-Colonel Evelyn George Harcourt Powell (21 February 1883 – 15 July 1961) was a British Army officer, and Conservative MP for Southwark South East.

Powell joined the British Army in 1901 and commanded the 1st Battalion, Grenadier Guards from 1923 to 1927, when he retired. 

He contested Southwark South East in 1929, won it from Labour in 1931, but lost it back to them in 1935.

Conservative Party (UK) MPs for English constituencies
1883 births
1961 deaths
Grenadier Guards officers
British Army personnel of World War I